The Caproni Ca.164 was a training biplane produced in Italy shortly prior to World War II. It was a largely conventional biplane intended as a follow-on to the Ca.100 and sharing that aircraft's layout with a slightly smaller upper wing.

Development
The prototype was designated the Ca.163, built by Caproni Taliedo and first flown on 17 November 1938. It had a steel tube fuselage, wooden wings, and fabric covering. Flight testing revealed some poor handling characteristics, however, which made it completely unsuitable for its intended role. Nevertheless, the Regia Aeronautica acquired some 280 examples of the Ca.164 to use in liaison roles within bomber units. Some of these were pressed into use for tactical reconnaissance during the Croatian campaign. The Armée de l'Air also purchased 100 aircraft.

Operators
 
 Armee de l'Air
 
 Regia Aeronautica
 Italian Co-Belligerent Air Force

Italian Air Force

Surviving aircraft
No examples of the Ca.164 survive, but the prototype Ca.163 is on display at the Gianni Caproni Museum of Aeronautics, Trento Airport, Italy. As a private venture, it was originally not registered, but it was later registered I-WEST.

Specifications

See also

References

Bibliography

 
 

Ca.164
1930s Italian civil trainer aircraft
Aircraft first flown in 1938